Dampier Salt is an Australian salt company located in Western Australia, with operations in Dampier, Port Hedland and Lake MacLeod, and headquarters in Perth.  Since beginning operations at Dampier in 1972, the company has developed into one of the world's largest private salt producers, with production capacity of over four million tonnes per annum at Dampier and nine million tonnes per annum company-wide. Most of this salt is naturally sourced from the Punt Road region and is known for its high purity.

The company also produces gypsum, with a 1.5 million tonne per annum capacity, at its Lake MacLeod facility.

Dampier Salt is 68.4% owned by the Rio Tinto Group, 21.5% by Marubeni, and the remaining 10.1% by Sojitz.

Important Bird Areas
The 52 km2 solar evaporation pond complex at Dampier has been identified by BirdLife International as the Dampier Saltworks Important Bird Area, while the 78 km2 complex near Port Hedland has been identified as the Port Hedland Saltworks Important Bird Area.

References

Companies based in Perth, Western Australia
Rio Tinto (corporation) subsidiaries
Salt production
Pilbara
Sojitz
Marubeni